POSXML (acronym for Point Of Sale eXtended Markup  Language) is a programming language, based on XML, that is used to create applications for a POS terminal.

Normally  the programming language used to develop such applications is C or C++. The main purpose of POSXML  is to simplify the development of applications for POS terminals. It contains a set of instructions and pre-programmed commands, which allow direct interaction with the machine, resulting in a large reduction in application development time.

Language features

The structure of POSXML 
POSXML  is organized and structured in the form of tags, showing levels and subsets of a set of commands and instructions, that form the logical structure of a POSXML application.

Example:

<!-- Variables declaration -->
<stringvariable value="" variable="sTicketInfo"/>
<stringvariable value="" variable="sCityInfo"/>
<integervariable value="0" variable="iQtdTickets"/>
<integervariable value="0" variable="iInvalidInfo"/>
		
<!-- Function Display MAIN Menu -->
<function name="fMainMenu">
    <integervariable value="0" variable="iOption"/>
			
    <!-- Main Menu -->
    <menu options="MAIN MENU:\\1.SALE OF TICKETS\2.REPORT\3.EXIT" variable="$(iOption)"/>
			
    <!-- 1.SALE OF TICKETS -->
    <if operator="equalto" value="1" variable="$(iOption)">
       ...
    </if>
    ...			
</function>

Compiled language 
Similar to the vast majority of existing programming languages, POSXML is compiled in a specific format to reduce the file size which allows the application to be run on a POS terminal using a framework (virtual machine).

When compiled, a program written in POSXML,  becomes a set of bytecodes that are interpreted by the virtual machine on the POS terminal which results in the implementation on the POS terminal.

Example:

<display line="0" column="0" message="Example of Bytecode" />
Compiled bytecode:
d0 \x0A 0 \x0A Bytecode example \x0A \x0D

Syntax 
The commands and instructions of POSXML, such as the compliance on the use of capital letters and lowercase letters (case sensitive), are acquired through training. Some commands  that belong to the language do not require parameters, unlike other commands that need input to interact with the machine.

Examples:

Commands that do not require instructions or parameters.

<network.hostdisconect/>
<cleandisplay />
<waitkey />

Commands that require instructions and parameters to interact with the equipment.

<display line="1" column="1" message="POSXML" />
<menu variable="$(var1)" options="MENU\1. first line\2. second line\3. third line"/>
<wait miliseconds="1000" />

The names given to functions, variables, and pages should also obey the rules written in capital letters and lowercase letters, so if a developer creates a function called "calcula_digito" he will not be able to call on the variable via "Calcula_Digito".  The call of a function, or variable page must meet the exact name that was assigned by the programmer.

Commands and instructions 
Because it is a structured language based on XML, POSXML is a language that is constantly evolving,  new commands and instructions can be added to your library at any time. Initially, the language had only  two dozen basic commands  to create a functional application on a POS terminal, using few resources: only the basic display (LCD), keypad, magnetic card reader and printer.

With the evolution of language, there are now almost one hundred commands and instructions available to deal with files, pictures, mathematical operators, functions to manipulate variables of the String type, definition of variables, logical operators, classes for working with protocol ISO 8583 (Protocol standard for exchanging information in transactions with credit cards), among others.

Variables and data types 
Variables in POSXML are typed; there are only two types, integer and string. POSXML limits the number of declared variables to 512.

These variables are declared global, i.e. They are shared throughout all the scheduled pages of the POSXML program in runtime process.

Examples:

String type variable:
<!-- Declaring a string type variable containing: "http://en.wikipedia.org/wiki/posxml" -->
<stringvariable value="http://en.wikipedia.org/wiki/posxml" variable="url" />

<!-- Accessing the content of the declared variable -->
<display line="0" column="0" message="$(url)" />

Integer  type variable:
<!-- Declaring an integer type variable containing: "0" -->
<integervariable value="0" variable="iValue" />

<inputmoney column="0" line="0" message="Enter the amount:" variable="$(iValue)" />

A call to a variable that is declared in the memory, is made by $(name_of_the_variable), regardless of its type.

It is also possible to convert a variable of one type into the other type. In POSXML the commands inttostring and stringtoint are used for this.

Examples:

<integervariable value="1" variable="iOpcao_Tipo_Inteiro" />
<stringvariable value=""  variable="sOpcao_Tipo_String" />

<inttostring integervariable="$(iOpcao_Tipo_Inteiro)" stringvariable="$(sOpcao_Tipo_String)" />

File system 
When writing an application for a POS terminal, the developer is faced  with the need to write to the specific file system of the equipment. The POSXML language works with files of type WALK dbFile  (A file system defined by the framework that interprets a program compiled POSXML).  This file system WALK dbFile uses the format: key = buffer\nkey = buffer\n, basically the format of text files in a Unix environment, where  is used to wrap. 
There are 8 basic commands in the POSXML language  to work with files in the POS terminal, they are.

 editfile
 readfile
 readfilebyindex
 deletefile
 file.open
 file.write
 file.read
 file.close

Examples:

<editfile filename="test.txt" key="$(sChave)" value="$(sValor)" />
 
<readfile filename="test.txt" key="$(sChave)" variabledestination="$(sRetorno)" />

<readfilebyindex filename="test.db" index="0" variablekey="$(var1)" variablevalue="$(var2)" variablereturn="$(var3)" />
 
<deletefile filename="test.txt" />

Code examples

The traditional "Hello World"
<!-- An example application that shows the phgrase "Hello World" on the display. -->

<!--  The command "display" shows a message in a row and column specific. -->
<display line="3" column="0" message="Hello World" />
<!--  The command "waitkey" waits till the operator press someone key for continue the execution. -->
<waitkey />

Menu, functions and impressions
<stringvariable value="" variable="stringName" />
<stringvariable value="" variable="stringValue" />
<integervariable value="0" variable="integerValue" />
<integervariable value="0" variable="integerOption" />
  
<!--  The command menu is used to show a menu in the terminal's display. The captured value is put in variable.  -->
<menu variable="$(integerOption)" options="\Menu\ 1) Main Function\ 2) Print Function" />

<if variable="$(integerOption)" operator="equalto" value="1" >
   <!--  The command callfunction is used to call a function defined with the function instruction.  -->
   <callfunction name="Main" />
</if>
  
<if variable="$(integerOption)" operator="equalto" value="2" >
   <!--  The command callfunction is used to call a function defined with the function instruction.  -->
   <callfunction name="Print" />
</if>
 
<!-- The command function is used to make functions in PosXml Application. -->
<function name="Main" >
  <!-- The command inputmoney is used to enter money values in the terminal.
       The terminal shows a mask with comma and points, while pressing the digit keys.
       The captured value is multiplied by 100 and put in variable without comma and points.
   -->
   <inputmoney variable="$(integerValue)" line="0" column="0" message="Input de Value:" />
   <cleandisplay />
   <!-- The command inttostring is used to convert an integer variable in a string variable. -->
   <inttostring variableinteger="$(integerValue)" variablestring="$(stringValue)" />
   <display line="2" column="0" message="Value is:" />
   <display line="3" column="0" message="$(stringValue)" />
   <waitkey />
</function>
 
<function name="Print" >
   <!-- The command inputformat is used to enter a value in a specific format.
        The format is specified in the format parameter. The value captured is put in variable.
    -->
   <inputformat variable="$(stringName)" line="0" column="0" message="Enter your name:" format="AAAAAAAAAA" / >
   <print message="$(stringName)" />
   <!-- The command paperfeed is used to advance paper of the terminal's printer. -->
   <paperfeed />
</function>

Dealing with the POS file
<stringvariable value="" variable="stringRet" />
<stringvariable value="" variable="stringWriteKey" />
<stringvariable value="" variable="stringWriteValue" />
  
<inputformat variable="$(stringWriteKey)" line="0" column="0" message="Input a key:" format="AAAAAAAAAA" />
<inputformat variable="$(stringWriteValue)" line="2" column="0" message="Input a value:" format="9999999999" />
<!-- The command editfile is used to write or edit a file in 'Walk Db format'.
     The format of the file in 'Walk Db format', is: ('key=value\nkey=value\n ... '). 
-->
<editfile filename="test.txt" key="$(stringWriteKey)" value="$(stringWriteValue)" />
<!-- The command readfile is used to read a file in 'Walk Db format'.
     The format of the file in 'Walk Db format', is: ('key=value\nkey=value\n ... ').
     If the file or key does exist, the value is a white space ' '.
 -->
<readfile filename="test.txt" key="$(stringWriteKey)" variabledestination="$(stringRet)" />
<!-- The command deletefile is used to remove a file from the terminal's memory. -->
<deletefile filename="test.txt" />
<!-- The command joinstring is used to join firstvalue and secondvalue in variabledestination. -->
<joinstring firstvalue="Result:" secondvalue="$(stringRet)" variabledestination="$(stringRet)" />
<cleandisplay />
<display line="4" column="0" message="$(stringRet)" />
<waitkey />

An example with while "While"
<!-- The command "stringvariable" creates in memory one variable of a type string, in this case the name is "sData". -->
<stringvariable value="" variable="stringData" />
<stringvariable value="KEY_CANCEL" variable="stringKey" />
  
<!-- The command "while" realizes a loop till the condition be satisfied in this case,
     when the value of "sKey" be different of "KEY_CANCEL". 
-->
<while variable="$(stringKey)" operator="equalto" value="KEY_CANCEL" >
   <!-- The command cleandisplay is used to clean the terminal's display. -->
   <cleandisplay />
   <!-- The command "getdatetime" extract the date and the hour internal in format specified,
     and save this value in "variabledestination". 
   -->
   <getdatetime format="d/M/yy h:m:s" variabledestination="$(stringData)" />
   <!-- The command "display" shows a message in a row and column specific. -->
   <display line="2" column="0" message="$(stringData)" />
   <!-- The command "readkey" waits a specified time in miliseconds to save in a string on "variablereturn",
        case not be tight anybody key, will be return the value "KEY_CANCEL". 
   -->
   <readkey miliseconds="800" variablereturn="$(stringKey)" />
</while>

<display line="2" column="0" message="$(stringKey)" />
<waitkey />

References

See also
 Credit cards
 Private label
 Visa Inc.
 Mastercard
 Visanet
 Redecard
 HDLC
 GPRS
 SSL
 RENPAC
 ADSL

Domain-specific programming languages
XML-based programming languages